The National Reform Movement is a political party in Antigua and Barbuda. In the 1999 elections NRM had a single candidate, Knolly Hill, who ran in the  St. Peter constituency. However, he received only 33 votes, and failed to win a seat.

References

External links
NRM website

Political parties in Antigua and Barbuda
Political parties with year of establishment missing
Political parties with year of disestablishment missing